Kinyarwanda is the national language of Rwanda, and the first language of almost the entire population of the country. It is one of the country's official languages alongside French, English, and Swahili. Rwandan Sign Language is used by the educated deaf population. As a slang, the younger population in Rwanda prefers to mix French with Kinyarwanda in a pidgin like way, with Kinyarwanda being the dominant influence in the pidgin.

French had been the language of administration from the country's time under Belgian administration, between the First World War and independence in 1962. Since the 1994 genocide, the complications of relations with successive French governments and the return of numerous Tutsi refugees from anglophone Uganda meant an increase in the use of English by a higher proportion of the population and administration.

In 2008, the government changed the medium of education from French to English. By 2018 the Rwandan government had introduced French as a foreign language class at the primary school level, and French was still widely used by members of the upper classes. A Rwandan historian, Antoine Mugesera, stated that French is still used among the educated, but Kinyarwanda is used for matters relating to simple topics and messages. English is now considered as the primary language among other foreign languages.

Swahili is used by some people, in commerce, and is taught as a subject in schools.

French was spoken by a bit under 6% of the population according to the 2012 census and the Organisation internationale de la Francophonie.
English was reported to be spoken by 15% of the population in 2009, though the same report found the proportion of French-speakers to be 68%.
Swahili is spoken by fewer than 1%.

References

External links 
 Linguistic situation of Rwanda (in French)
 Ntakirutimana, Évariste (National University of Rwanda). "LE FRANÇAIS AU RWANDA" (Archive). University of Nice.
 Steflja, Isabela. "The Costs and Consequences of Rwanda’s Shift in Language Policy" (Archive). Africa Initiative. 31 May 2012.
 McGreal, Chris. "Why Rwanda said adieu to French" (Archive). The Guardian. Friday 16 January 2009.